Julian (Yulian) Grigoryevich Sitkovetsky (7 November 1925 – 23 February 1958) was a Soviet violinist.

Biography
Sitkovetsky was born in Kiev. He started violin lesson at age 4, first with his father, then with David Bertie at the Central School in Kiev. As a child prodigy, he was chosen to play for Jacques Thibaud at age 8. One year later, he played the Mendelssohn concerto with the Kiev Symphony. In 1939, he enrolled in the Moscow Central Music School, class of Abram Yampolsky, whose students included Leonid Kogan, Igor Besrodny and Rotislav Dubinsky.

In 1945 Julian Sitkovetsky won the All Soviet Union Young Performers Competition of piano, cello and violin (Sviatoslav Richter and Mstislav Rostropovich were the winners in piano and cello). In 1947, he shared First Prize at the Prague Festival with Leonid Kogan and Igor Besrodny.

He married pianist Bella Davidovich in 1950 and their son Dmitry Sitkovetsky (who became an eminent violinist and conductor) was born four years later.

In 1952, he shared Second prize in the Henryk Wieniawski Violin Competition with Wanda Wilkomirska (first prize was Igor Oistrakh). In 1955 he won Second Prize at the Queen Elizabeth Music Competition. (Of which Yehudi Menuhin said: "...David Oistrakh and I were on the jury...he should have had First Prize...").

Julian Sitkovetsky never toured much, as he was diagnosed with lung cancer in 1956. He died in Moscow in 1958 at age 32.

Legacy
Joseph Magil, critic (himself a violinist and violist) of the American Record Guide, said of Sitkovetsky : "...David Oistrakh said that, had he lived, Sitkovetsky would have eclipsed him and Kogan…. He had a broad, firm, focused tone in all registers; flawless intonation; a rapid, even trill; a swift, perfectly controlled staccato; strong, immaculate harmonics; an even, clear sautillé..."

Discography

References

American Record Guide, June'July 2006

External links

Russian classical violinists
Male classical violinists
Ukrainian violinists
Musicians from Kyiv
Prize-winners of the Queen Elisabeth Competition
Henryk Wieniawski Violin Competition prize-winners
1925 births
1958 deaths
20th-century classical violinists
20th-century Russian male musicians